Ihenacho is both a given name and surname. Notable people with the name include:

Carl Ihenacho (born 1988), American football player
Duke Ihenacho (born 1989), American football player
Kennedy Ihenacho (born 1990), Nigerian musician
Leo Ihenacho (born 1977), British singer

See also
Ego Ihenacho Ogbaro, Nigerian musician